Parabola is a double album by jazz composer, arranger, conductor and pianist Gil Evans recorded in Italy in 1978 by Evans with an orchestra featuring Arthur Blythe, Steve Lacy and Lew Soloff and released on the Italian Horo label.

Reception
Allmusic awarded the album 3½ stars.

Track listing
All compositions by Gil Evans except as indicated
 "Waltz" - 14:22
 "Up from the Skies" (Jimi Hendrix) - 4:20  
 "Parabola" (Alan Shorter) - 11:52
 "Stone Free" (Hendrix) - 21:58  
 "Variation" - 24:00

Personnel
Gil Evans - piano, electric piano, arranger, conductor
Lew Soloff - trumpet 
Earl McIntyre - trombone
Steve Lacy - soprano saxophone
Arthur Blythe - alto saxophone, soprano saxophone
Pete Levin - keyboards
Don Pate - bass
Noel McGhie - drums

References

1979 albums
Gil Evans albums
Albums arranged by Gil Evans
Horo Records albums